Cigarette burns are injuries caused by lit cigarettes.

Cigarette Burns may also refer to:

Cue marks, a marking used in film
Cigarette Burns, an episode of Masters of Horror
Cigarette Burns, an episode of Dawson's Creek